Thomas & Friends: All Engines Go is an animated comedy children's television series created by Britt Allcroft and developed by Rick Suvalle that premiered on Cartoon Network's Cartoonito block in the United States on September 13, 2021, and on Treehouse in Canada on September 18, 2021. It is produced by Mattel Television, with animation provided by Nelvana.

The series serves as a reboot of the original Thomas & Friends series that ran from 1984 until 2021. It was originally believed to be a continuation of the original series (with the two seasons labeled as series 25 and 26), but Mattel Television later confirmed it to be a separate series. It introduces "an entirely new approach to Thomas & Friends content," with a new animation style and story structure.

In October 2022, the series was renewed for two more seasons of 26 episodes each, to premiere in 2023.

Plot
The series follows the adventures of a now child-aged Thomas and the other engines in his age group, as they learn many life lessons and solve problems while going around on their daily lives doing jobs with help from each other and the other residents and visitors of the island.

Characters

Main
 Thomas (voiced by Meesha Contreras in the US/Canada and by Aaron Barashi in the UK), a small, cheeky blue anthropomorphic tank engine who always tries to do his best and the lead main character.
 Percy (voiced by Charlie Zeltzer in the US/Canada and by Henri Charles in the UK), a little green saddle tank engine who loves fun as much as his best friend Thomas, but is not quite as adventurous and is content to let him take the lead.
 Kana (voiced by Ava Ro in the US/Canada and by Chloe Raphael in the UK), a lavender bullet train from Japan and the first to live on Sodor. She loves to race, and often creates gusts of wind due to her speed. Kana sometimes has some trouble with burning out her battery levels by speeding.
 Nia (voiced by Talia Evans in the US/Canada and by Sade Smith in the UK), a fun-loving orange tank engine that comes from Kenya, in Africa, and loves to think up new, creative ideas.
 Diesel (voiced by Shomoy James Mitchell in season one and by Will Bhaneja in season two in the US/Canada, and Henry Harrison in the UK), a pushy diesel shunter that dreams of one day being able to beat Thomas in one of their many races together.
 Carly (voiced by Jenna Warren in the US/Canada and by Eva Mohamed in the UK), a chirpy yellow crane engine who is mainly relied upon to do the lifting and shifting. Carly was introduced as a gantry crane in series 21 of Thomas & Friends.
 Sandy (voiced by Glee Dango in the US/Canada and by Holly Dixon in the UK), a pink rail speeder who can fix anything with her handy toolbox.
 Bruno (voiced by Chuck Smith in the US/Canada and by Elliott Garcia in the UK), a red American brake car that loves routine and hates surprises. He was first introduced in season two, and is the first character in the franchise to be explicitly autistic.

Supporting
 Gordon (voiced by Neil Crone in the US/Canada and by Will Harrison-Wallace in the UK), a wise blue tender engine that acts as the kind yet stern supervisor and father figure to the main cast. Crone had previously voiced Gordon in Thomas and the Magic Railroad.
 Cranky (voiced by Cory Doran in the US/Canada and by Will Harrison-Wallace in the UK), a large green dockside crane known for his grumpy attitude.
 James (voiced by Luke Marty in the US/Canada and early UK episodes and by Tom Dussek in the UK from episode 49 onwards), a red tender engine who is friendly but can be egotistical and impatient.
 Annie and Clarabel (voiced by Catherine Disher and Linda Kash respectively in the US/Canada and early UK episodes and both by Wendy Patterson in the UK from episode 41 onwards), two kindly orange-brown passenger coaches who are usually pulled by Thomas.
 Troublesome Trucks (voiced by Jamie Watson (as the green truck) and Cory Doran (as the brown truck) in the US/Canada and both by Jai Armstrong in the UK), two bad-mannered cargo trucks who will do anything to avoid hard work.
 Sir Topham Hatt (voiced by Bruce Dow in the US/Canada and early UK episodes and by Tom Dussek in the UK from episode 41 onwards), the owner of the Sodor Railway who arranges all the special events on the island. He is the only human character in the series thus far to actually interact and converse with the engines.
 Harold (voiced by Bruce Dow in the US/Canada and by Jai Armstrong in the UK), a white helicopter who performs patrols the skies for emergencies.
 Kenji (voiced by Kintaro Akiyama in the US/Canada and by Dai Tabuchi in the UK), an empathetic high-speed bullet train from Japan that has won many races around the world.
 Ultratrain (voiced by Cory Doran), a superheroic engine and the main protagonist of Thomas' favorite film series.
 Trainiac (voiced by Cory Doran), a villainous engine in Thomas' favorite film series, and the arch-nemesis of Ultratrain.
 Hiro (voiced by Kintaro Akiyama in the US/Canada and by Dai Tabuchi in the UK), a kind Japanese tender engine that is respected by the other engines.
 Bulstrode (voiced by Jamie Watson in the US/Canada Will Harrison-Wallace in the UK), a big, slow, steady, self-propelled barge who is usually laidback.
 Skiff (voiced by Jamie Watson in the US/Canada and by Jai Armstrong in the UK), a small sailboat that loves to challenge himself at really high winds.
 Yong Bao (voiced by Patrick Kwok-Choon in the US/Canada and by Lobo Chan in the UK), a large tender engine from China that has performed many heroic deeds of bravery.
 Emily (voiced by Kayla Lorette in the US/Canada and by Marie Ekins in the UK), an emerald tender engine who serves as the official safety engine of the island and Sir Topham Hatt's main transport.
 Ashima (voiced by Diya Kittur in the US/Canada), a colorfully decorated pink tank engine from a mountain railway in India.
 Tess (voiced by Kaia Ozdemir in the US/Canada), a young and impatient teal green gantry crane stationed at the Kellsthorpe canal. She is based on the same crane that inspired Carly's design in the original series.
 Beresford (voiced by Dan Chameroy in the US/Canada and Matt Coles in the UK), a large and scatterbrained blue gantry crane stationed near Norramby Beach. He was originally a mainland crane in the original series.
 Whiff (voiced by Joe Pingue in the US/Canada and Matt Coles in the UK), a bespectacled dark green tank engine who works at the recycling plant, often using its supplies to fuel his experiments. The character was mentioned multiple times in season one, but did not appear in-person until the second season.
 Darcy (voiced by Dana Puddicombe in the US/Canada and Jessica Caroll in the UK), a large roadheader responsible for digging the mines under Lookout Mountain. She was first introduced in the special The Mystery of Lookout Mountain.

Other characters include Edward and Henry, who make periodic cameos throughout the series but have yet to be referred to by name.

Production
In October 2020, Mattel Television formed a new co-production partnership with Corus Entertainment's Nelvana Studio and greenlit two new seasons for the Thomas & Friends series, consisting of 104 11-minute episodes and two hour-long specials. The new episodes were said to be produced using 2D animation and include more physical comedy and music than before.

The new series was officially announced on February 5, 2021. Executive producer Christopher Keenan said it was, "crafted to appeal to contemporary audiences' sensibilities while maintaining Thomas' core brand ethos".

On October 11, 2022, Mattel announced that the series was renewed for a third and fourth season, each consisting of 26 episodes and a special, set to premiere in 2023.

Episodes

Series overview

Season 1 (2021–22)

Season 2 (2022–23)

Specials

Shorts

Release
Cartoon Network and Netflix have the broadcast and streaming rights to the series in the United States. The series premiered on September 13, 2021, as part of Cartoon Network's Cartoonito preschool programming block. The series was made available to stream on Netflix on October 29, 2021.

Channel 5 acquired the UK broadcast rights to the series and began airing it on their Milkshake! pre-school block on November 8, 2021, redubbed with British voice actors. On the same day, the first hour-long special, titled Race for the Sodor Cup was confirmed for a theatrical release on September 17, 2021, in order to introduce the series and the new look in the country. The series premiered in Canada on Treehouse on September 18, 2021.

In October 2021, Mattel Television announced they had pre-sold the series to many broadcasters around the world, including Nick Jr. for British pay-TV rights, TF1 in France and WarnerMedia for MENA and Latin American regions.

Home media

North America
On August 31, 2021, Mill Creek Entertainment and NCircle Entertainment's parent company Alliance Entertainment announced a US and Canadian distribution deal with Mattel. Such rights included the DVD rights to All Engines Go, which NCircle would distribute.

NCircle's first DVD release of the series - "Time for Teamwork!", was released on December 7, 2021, which contains 8 episodes. The Race for the Sodor Cup special was released on DVD on March 8, 2022. The next episodic DVD release - "Best Friends", was released on May 24, 2022. A fourth DVD release, entitled 'Special Delivery', was released on September 6, 2022. A fifth DVD release, entitled 'Musical Fun!', was released on January 31, 2023. The Mystery of Lookout Mountain special will release on DVD on April 4, 2023.

United Kingdom
The Race for the Sodor Cup special was released on DVD on February 14, 2022. This was followed by an Amazon Prime release of Best Friend Adventures.

Reception
The show, trailers, and other promotional materials posted on social media have been met with backlash from parents.

Notes

References

External links 
 
 

Thomas & Friends
English-language television shows
Television series about rail transport
2021 British television series debuts
2021 American television series debuts
2021 Canadian television series debuts
Television series by Mattel Creations
Television series by Nelvana
Netflix children's programming
2020s British animated television series
2020s American animated television series
2020s Canadian animated television series
2020s British children's television series
2020s American children's television series
2020s Canadian children's television series
Animated television series reboots
Cartoon Network original programming
Cartoonito original programming
Treehouse TV original programming
American children's animated television series
Canadian children's animated television series
2020s preschool education television series
British preschool education television series
American preschool education television series
Canadian preschool education television series
Animated preschool education television series
Animation controversies in television
Television series created by Britt Allcroft